The 2018 California Attorney General election was held on November 6, 2018, to elect the Attorney General of California. The 2014 election winner Kamala Harris was elected to the United States Senate during the 2016 Senate election; incumbent Democratic Attorney General, Xavier Becerra won election to a full term.

Primary

Democratic Party

Declared
 Xavier Becerra, incumbent Attorney General of California and former U.S. Representative
 Dave Jones, California Insurance Commissioner

Republican Party

Declared
 Steven Bailey, retired El Dorado County Superior Court Judge
 Eric Early, Managing Partner of Early Sullivan Wright Gizer & McRae LLP

Withdrawn
 Michael A. Ramos, District Attorney for San Bernardino County, California

Peace and Freedom Party

Declared
 Adriane Bracciale, criminal defense attorney in the Inland Empire

Endorsements

Polling

Results

General election

Polling

Results
Becerra won the election in a landslide, even outperforming Gavin Newsom during the simultaneous gubernatorial election.

References

External links
Official campaign websites
Steven Bailey (R) for Attorney General
Xavier Becerra (D) for Attorney General

Attorney General
2018
California